BM Linx was a psychedelic rock group formed in 2005 by Tony Diodore (guitar & violin) with Jonathan Murray (bass), and Andrew Griffith (drums). The origin of the name stems from a friend of Diodore's, who owned a Mercury Lynx, but put a BMW badge on the front and called it a BM Linx.

The band released its EP, The Portable Genius in 2006, and full-length album Black Entertainment in 2008. The band toured the U.S., Canada, and Europe, performing at many festivals, but have been on hiatus since 2010, and their third record remains unfinished.

References

Musical groups from Brooklyn
Psychedelic rock music groups from New York (state)